David Black (19 April 1892 – 27 October 1936) was a pitcher in Major League Baseball who played in the Federal League from  through  for the Chicago Whales (1914–1915) and Baltimore Terrapins (1915) and with the Boston Red Sox of the American League in . Black batted left-handed and threw right-handed. He was born in Chicago, Illinois.

In a three-season career, Black posted an 8–10 record with 72 strikeouts and a 3.18 earned run average in 181⅓ innings pitched.

In the field, he handled 69 total chances without an error for a perfect 1.000 fielding percentage

External links

1892 births
1936 deaths
Major League Baseball pitchers
Minor league baseball managers
Chicago Whales players
Baltimore Terrapins players
Boston Red Sox players
Peoria Distillers players
Baseball players from Chicago